Manitoba Health  (formerly Health, and Seniors Care, MHSC; also known as Manitoba Health) is the department of the Government of Manitoba that is responsible for leading the development of policy and publicly-administered health system planning in the province of Manitoba; the overall funding, performance requirements, oversight, and accountability within the system; promoting prevention and positive health practices; and administering other non-devolved health services in the province.

The department operates under the Minister of Health, who has been Audrey Gordon . The Chief Provincial Public Health Officer, Brent Roussin, serves under the Minister and Deputy Minister of Health.

The department is the authoritative agency in the province regarding the COVID-19 pandemic in Manitoba.

Overview 
Manitoba Health funds a social program that is delivered partially by the department and partially through grant agencies, arm’s-length service delivery organizations (SDOs), independent physicians, or other service providers paid via fee-for-service or alternate means. Most direct services are delivered through the Regional Health Authorities (RHAs) and other health care organizations. Manitoba Health, on the other hand, directly delivers only a small portion of the program itself, particularly managing the direct operations of Selkirk Mental Health Centre, Cadham Provincial Laboratory, and 3 northern nursing stations. The department also administers such non-devolved health services as Pharmacare, insured benefits, fee-for-service physician services, etc. The ultimate result is an intricate combination of insured benefits, funded services provided via public institutions—ranging from community-based primary care to third-party teaching hospitals—and publicly-regulated but privately-provided services, such as for-profit personal care homes.

Manitoba Health also plays a role in policy, planning, funding, and oversight that ensures that SDOs (e.g., RHA, CancerCare Manitoba, Addictions Foundation of Manitoba, and over 100 primarily non-profit organizations) are accountable to provide high-quality services at a reasonable cost.

Minister of Health 

The Minister of Health is the cabinet minister responsible for Manitoba Health, guided by the Public Health Act of Manitoba.

See also 

 Winnipeg Regional Health Authority
 Manitoba Health Research Council
 Manitoba Centre for Health Policy
 Public Health Agency of Canada
 Health Council of Canada
 Canadian Institutes of Health Research

References

External links 
 Manitoba Health and Seniors Care

Manitoba government departments and agencies
Government health agencies